Howard M. Tesher (1932 – January 20, 2023) was an American Thoroughbred horse racing trainer. A journalism graduate from the University of Florida, he began his career training Thoroughbreds in 1961. Among his numerous important wins, Tesher won the 1986 Washington, D.C. International Stakes at Laurel Park Racecourse with 37:1 long shot, Lieutenant's Lark.

References

1935 births
2023 deaths
American horse trainers
Sportspeople from Miami
Sports coaches from Miami